David Mann (born 26 June 1962) is a former British professional racing cyclist. He took part in the 1987 UCI Road World Championships.

Major results

1987
 3rd Overall GP Leeds
 3rd Norwich Spring Classic
1988
 3rd Grand Prix de Rennes
1989
 10th Dwars door Vlaanderen
1990
 1st  Sprints classification Tour of Britain
1992
 1st Stage 2 Tour DuPont
 6th Overall Casper Classic
1st Stages 1 and 3 (TTT)
1993
 1st  Overall Herald Sun Tour
1st Stages 1 & 8

References

External links

1962 births
Living people
British male cyclists